The 1986 Bucknell Bison football team was an American football team that represented Bucknell University during the 1986 NCAA Division I-AA football season. In the first year of play for the Colonial League, Bucknell tied for last place. 

In their first year under head coach George Landis, the Bison compiled a 3–7 record. Earl Beecham and Doug Fastuca were the team captains.

Bucknell's 1–3 conference record tied for fourth in the five-team Colonial League standings. Against all opponents, the Bison were outscored 223 to 171.

Bucknell played its home games at Memorial Stadium on the university campus in Lewisburg, Pennsylvania.

Schedule

References

Bucknell
Bucknell Bison football seasons
Bucknell Bison football